Thille Boubacar Arrondissement is an arrondissement of the Podor Department in the Saint-Louis Region of Senegal.

Subdivisions
The arrondissement is divided administratively into rural communities and in turn into villages.

Arrondissements of Senegal
Saint-Louis Region